Ashutosh Gowariker (born 15 February 1964) is an Indian film director, actor, screenwriter and producer who works in Hindi cinema. He is known for directing films "set on a huge canvas while boasting of an opulent treatment".

His is particularly known for Lagaan (2001), Swades (2004), Jodhaa Akbar (2008), and Mohenjo Daro (2016).

His film Lagaan was nominated in the Best Foreign Language Film category in 74th Academy Awards, which makes him a voting member of the Academy Awards. He returned to acting by playing the lead role in the critically acclaimed comedy drama Ventilator (2016).

Early life 
Gowariker was born into a Marathi-speaking family to Ashok and Kishori Gowariker, in Kohlapur. He is married to Sunita, Deb Mukherjee's daughter from his first marriage. They have two sons, Konark and Vishwang.

Career 

Acting Career
 
Gowariker started his career as an actor, making his debut in 1984 in director Ketan Mehta's picture Holi. On the Holi sets, Gowariker met Aamir Khan with whom he go on to collaborate with years later. After that, he acted in several television serials, including Kacchi Dhoop (1987), Circus (1989), C.I.D. (1998) and several films, including Naam (1986), Goonj (1989), Chamatkar (1992), and Kabhi Haan Kabhi Naa (1993). He returned to acting by playing the lead role in the critically acclaimed Marathi comedy drama Ventilator (2016), which was produced by Priyanka Chopra. Allegedly, he took about 6 months to agree to do the film.

As a Director
 
In 1993, he made his directorial debut with Pehla Nasha. Upon release, film received negative reviews and failed at the box office. His second movie Baazi (1995), starred Aamir Khan and Mamta Kulkarni.
 
Success
 
2000's decade was dream decade for Ashutosh with highly critical and commercial success he received. In 2001, Gowariker wrote and directed the period epic movie Lagaan, produced by and starring Aamir Khan. Lagaan was the story of a cricket match between British officers and Indian villagers in the late 19th century. It ranked third among 2001's Indian movies in terms of gross revenue.

In 2004, Gowariker directed Swades, starring Shahrukh Khan. Swades was theatrically released on 17 December 2004, and it opened to rave reviews from critics, with praise for the performances of Khan, Joshi and Ballal, and the story, screenplay, and soundtrack. However, it emerged as a commercial failure at the box office. Eventually over the years film gets cult status.
 
Jodhaa Akbar (2008), another historical epic romance set in the 16th century, starred Hrithik Roshan and Aishwarya Rai. Upon release, it was a critical and commercial success and became the third highest grossing Hindi film of 2008. The film was cited as "10 Great Bollywood Films of the 21st Century" by British Film Institute. The film garnered awards and nominations in several categories, with particular praise for its direction, music, cinematography, costume design, choreography and lead performances (Aishwarya and Hrithik). The film won 48 awards from 84 nominations.
 
Failure
 
Gowariker's romantic comedy What's Your Raashee? (2009), starred Priyanka Chopra in 12 roles and Harman Baweja. The film had its world premiere at the 2009 Toronto International Film Festival and was released on 25 September 2009. With a box office gross ₹17 crore, it was unsuccessful and received mixed reviews, with criticism for its over three-and-a-half-hour run time and its screenplay.
 
Khelein Hum Jee Jaan Sey (2010), about the Chittagong Uprising set in undivided Bengal of 1930,  it was based on Manini Chatterjee's Do and Die, an account of the 1930 Chittagong armoury raid, starred Abhishek Bachchan and Deepika Padukone. It received mix reviews but commercially failed at box office.
 
After long gap of 6 years, In 2016, Gowariker directed the film Mohenjo Daro, starring Hrithik Roshan and Pooja Hegde. Film opened with generally unfavourable reviews as it clashed with Akshay Kumar starrer Rustom. Mohenjo Daro bombed at box office marking third successive failure of Govarikar.
 
He directed Panipat (2019) based on third battle of Panipat. Starring Arjun Kapoor, Sanjay Dutt and Kriti Sanon, it depicts the events that took place during the Third Battle of Panipat. The film was theatrically released in India on 6 December 2019. The film was a box office failure.

Filmography

Director

Actor

Awards

References

External links 

 Official website
 

|-
! colspan="3" style="background: #DAA520;" | Filmfare Awards
|-
 

|-
 

|-
 

1964 births
Living people
Indian male film actors
Indian male television actors
20th-century Indian film directors
Film producers from Mumbai
Indian male voice actors
Hindi-language film directors
Marathi people
Filmfare Awards winners
Screen Awards winners
Zee Cine Awards winners
International Indian Film Academy Awards winners
Male actors in Hindi cinema
Film directors from Mumbai
21st-century Indian film directors
Male actors from Mumbai
Directors who won the Best Popular Film Providing Wholesome Entertainment National Film Award